Compulsive talking (or talkaholism) is talking that goes beyond the bounds of what is considered to be socially acceptable. The main factors in determining if someone is a compulsive talker are talking in a continuous manner or stopping only when the other person starts talking, and others perceiving their talking as a problem. Personality traits that have been positively linked to this compulsion include assertiveness, willingness to communicate, self-perceived communication competence, and neuroticism. Studies have shown that most people who are talkaholics are aware of the amount of talking they do, are unable to stop, or do not see it as a problem.

Characteristics
It has been suggested, through research done by James C. McCroskey and Virginia P. Richmond, that United States society finds talkativeness attractive. It is something which is rewarded and positively correlated with leadership and influence. However, those who compulsively talk are not to be confused with those who are simply highly verbal and vary their quantity of talk. Compulsive talkers are those who are highly verbal in a manner that differs greatly from the norm and is not in the person's best interest. Those who have been characterized as compulsive talkers talk with a greater frequency, dominate conversations, and are less inhibited than others. They have also been found to be more argumentative and have a positive attitude regarding communication. Tendencies towards compulsive talking also are more frequently seen in the personality structure of neurotic psychotic extraverts. It has also been found that talkaholics are never behaviorally shy.

Talkaholic scale
In 1993 James C. McCroskey and Virginia P. Richmond constructed the Talkaholic Scale, a Likert-type model, to help identify those who are compulsive talkers. A score of 40 or above, which indicates two standard deviations above the norm, would signal someone to be a true talkaholic.

Cultural similarities
A study of 811 university students in the United States found 5.2% had results indicating they were talkaholics. A similar study of students from New Zealand found similar results, with 4.7% scoring above 40.

Consequences and management
Compulsive talking can drive people away, which in turn can leave that person with no social support. Interrupting, another act that is associated with talkaholics, can signal to other people a lack of respect.

According to Elizabeth Wagele, an author of best-selling books on personality types, there are different ways to handle compulsive talkers. Such coping techniques include changing the focus of the conversation, taking attention away from the talkaholic, leaving the conversation, and creating a distraction.

See also
 Chatterbox
 Compulsive behavior
 Compulsive lying
 Conversation
 Tourette syndrome

References

Further reading
 Axsom JR Compulsive Talkers: Perceptions of Over Talkers Within the Workplace (2006)
 Brians P How to overcome compulsive talking (1987)
 Bostrom RN, Harrington NG An exploratory investigation of characteristics of compulsive talkers Communication Education Volume 48 Issue 1 Pages 73–80 (1999)
 Bostrom R, Grant N, Davis W Characteristics of compulsive talkers: A preliminary investigation - Paper presented at the annual meeting of the International Communication Association (1990)

External links
 Talkaholic Scale (TAS)

Habit and impulse disorders
Oral communication
Speech and language pathology